Henry Adrian "Packy" Schade (December 3, 1900 – August 12, 1992) was a United States Navy officer, naval architect, and professor.

During World War II, Schade was Head of the Carrier Desk for the United States Navy's Bureau of Ships. Schade added materially in overcoming the shortage of aircraft carriers of all types by overseeing their accelerated construction thereby contributing to the defeat of the German Submarine campaign, the shift from the defensive to the offensive in the Pacific, and the subsequent successful prosecution of the war.

Near the end of the war, Schade served as Chief of the United States Naval Technical Mission in Europe. The Mission was charged with the responsibility of exploiting German science and technology for the benefit of the United States Navy's technical Bureaus.

Early life and education
He was born in Saint Paul, Minnesota. He attended Central High School. He was appointed to the United States Naval Academy by the US Congressman from the Fourth District of Minnesota in 1919.

He was called "Packy II" at first, after a more athletic student who had attended six years earlier at the Academy. His own athletic talents led his classmates to drop the "II" later.

He was on the Plebe and Junior Varsity crew teams.

In 1923, Schade graduated from the Naval Academy with distinction, seventh in his class of 414. On He was commissioned Ensign in the United States Navy and ordered to the battleship . There Schade became Communication Watch Officer.

In May 1925, Schade started postgraduate work in Naval Architecture at the Naval Academy's Postgraduate School, Annapolis, Maryland. In 1926, he attended the Construction Corps. He continued his education at Massachusetts Institute of Technology (MIT), where he received his Master of Science degree in Naval Architecture in June 1928. Schade's Masters thesis entitled Deformation and Stresses in Pipe Bends was published later that same year by MIT's Department of Naval Construction.

Early naval career
After graduating from MIT, Schade was briefly at the Edgewood Arsenal in Maryland and then at the Brooklyn Navy Yard in New York City. From October 1928, and for the three succeeding years, Schade served in the Industrial Department at Mare Island Navy Yard, California. In December 1931 Schade joined the Design Section within the Bureau of Construction and Repair.  He was promoted to lieutenant. He furthered the development of the use of welding in naval ship construction until January 1935.

Schade was then assigned to the Experimental Model Basin, which was then at the Washington Navy Yard. Detached from the Model Basin in July 1936, he was ordered overseas to attend the Technische Hochschule Berlin-Charlottenburg. In June 1937 Schade received the degree of Doctor of Engineering in Naval Architecture for his research on strength of ship structures and his landmark dissertation entitled Statik des Schiff-Bodens unter Wasserdruck. An English translation by Schade was published as Theory of Motions of Craft in Waves.

After graduating, but prior to leaving Europe, the Bureau of Ships ordered Schade on a tour of inspection, as student observer, of representative shipbuilding plants and model basins in German ports; plus naval establishments of The Netherlands, France, Britain, Italy, and Austria. Completing his tour of European naval facilities by the end of August, 1937, Schade then returned to the United States.

Lieutenant Schade was then ordered to serve in the Office of the Superintending Constructor, later redesignated Office of the Supervisor of Shipbuilding, Newport News Shipbuilding and Dry Dock Company in Virginia. On June 23, 1938, less than one year into his duty at Newport News, Schade was promoted to the rank of lieutenant commander. Also that summer, the professional organization of Society of Naval Architects and Marine Engineers (SNAME) published Schade's paper on his study of Bending Theory of Ship Bottom Structure. In June 1940, all Constructors (Naval Architects) and Engineers (Marine Engineers) were united into a new Bureau of Ships All such technical personnel were then transferred from the line of the Navy and redesignated Engineering Duty Only - or EDOs.

This massive reorganization of the Navy's technical Bureaus created new opportunities for younger officers with potential. Following the reorganization of the Bureau he was promoted to commander. He assumed the billet of Senior Naval Liaison Officer (SNLO) assigned to Newport News Shipbuilding and Dry Dock. The SNLO is the direct link between BuShips' ship "type desk" and the actual building and builder stationed in their yard. At this time Newport News was tackling the mighty job of acting as design agent, responsible for the creation of detailed working drawings, for the Navy's new s. This made Schade the Carrier (type) Desk's direct liaison at Newport News solely to effect work on the Essex design.

During 1941, the Society of Naval Architects and Marine Engineers again published one of Schade's studies. His new study was entitled: Design Curves for Cross-Stiffened Plating Under Uniform Bending Load. This paper proved to be an important work, as the theories espoused therein by Schade were thereafter accepted and adopted by BuShips as new policy and practice regarding estimating static responses on welded stiffened ship panels.

Just four days before the Japanese aerial attack on Pearl Harbor, Commander Schade celebrated his 42nd birthday. By all accounts he had done a tremendous job over the previous two years at Newport News working diligently on the Essex project. His efforts had not gone unnoticed in the Bureau of Ships. With the nation now at war, his reward would not be long in coming.

World War II
Pearl Harbor had a dramatic impact on the leadership of BuShips. The Bureau's Chief, RAdm. Samuel M. "Mike" Robinson, and Deputy Chief, RAdm. Alexander H. Van Keuren, immediately recognized that this new war would be conducted just as the Japanese conducted the raid on Pearl Harbor. This would be a carrier war. To successfully prosecute this war, the United States Navy would need both better carriers and more of them to defeat their enemies. To get these ships built both quickly and properly would take skill, ability, and leadership. To get that leadership they would need to fill each key position within the Bureau with the officer best suited to handle the colossal challenges that lie before them.

The Chief and Deputy Chief of BuShips wasted no time reorganizing their personnel to meet the demands of a two-ocean war. In the weeks following the attack on Pearl Harbor orders were sent to ships and stations around the world recalling the people they felt best suited for a particular task. One such recall was Commander Schade. Ordered detached from his role as SNLO at Newport News in late December 1941, he was to report to "Main Navy" for duty at the Bureau of Ships by January 1, 1942.

Just three weeks after turning 42, Schade had been identified as the ideal candidate to head the Bureau's Carrier Desk during the country's first-ever carrier war. Quite a responsibility for a commander. Nearly all of the Bureau's ship type desks were run by officers with the rank of captain. The fact that the most important ship type, arguably the aircraft carrier, for the anticipated nature of fighting would be placed in the hands of a mere commander speaks volumes as to the complete faith both Robinson and Van Keuren had in Schade. There were thousands within the bureau that in some way would contribute to developing the Navy's carriers, but it was up to Schade to get those carriers built and fully prepared to join the fleet.

In January 1942 Schade was assigned to the Navy's Bureau of Ships, where he was responsible for the design of the  carriers, with innovations including the use of the flight deck as a structural element (previously flight decks were flimsy wooden platforms perched above the ship proper).

For Schade's efforts as head of the Carrier Desk during World War II, he was awarded the Legion of Merit. The commendation attached to his award read as follows:

Two days before Christmas, 1944, Captain Schade was advanced to the rank of commodore.

In January 1945, Commodore Schade was ordered to report to the Office of the Chief of Naval Operations for a very special reassignment of duty. Schade was to create, and head, a team of scientific and technical specialists to obtain and exploit German science and technologies in areas immediately behind the front lines of fighting in Europe. As allied ground forces gained ground, Schade and his scientists would rush into the void left behind advancing forces to study the equipment and weaponry employed by the Germans. The United States Naval Technical Mission in Europe was particularly interested the capture and study of rocketry and all things naval as German ports and bases were wrested from Hitler's forces. Schade initially headquartered the Mission in Paris, but soon the Mission was constantly on the move as allied forces advanced more and more rapidly deeper into German-occupied territories and then into Germany itself.

Post-War
Schade's exceptional work as chief of the United States Naval Technical Mission in Europe earned him a Gold Star in lieu of a second Legion of Merit. The commendation which accompanied his Gold Star read as follows:

Following the war, Schade was also bestowed with the American Defense Service Medal, the European-African-Middle Eastern Campaign Medal, the American Campaign Medal, and the World War II Victory Medal. Additionally, the Government of Great Britain made Schade an Honorary Officer of the Military Division of the Most Excellent Order of the British Empire.

On November 1, 1945, he was appointed Director of the Naval Research Laboratory, at Anacostia, relieving the man who had chosen him to run the Carrier Desk at the outbreak of the war, Rear Admiral Alexander H. Van Keuren. The NRL conducted the most sophisticated and extensive forms of research and experiments in the Navy Department for the benefit of her technical bureaus.

Schade remained as Director of the Naval Research Laboratory until his retirement from the Navy Department on February 1, 1949.

Teaching career
Schade was named Professor of Mechanical Engineering and Director of Research for the University of California College of Engineering at Berkeley effective upon his retirement from the US Navy.

In 1950, Schade's doctoral dissertation Statik Des Schift-Bodens Unter-Wasserdruck, written for Technische Hochschule 13 years prior in Berlin, was translated to English by Packy Schade himself and published as Theory of Motions of Craft in Waves by the Department of Engineering, University of California, Berkeley.

In 1958 he organized a Department of Naval Architecture at Berkeley, serving as its first chair.  (The department later added offshore engineering, but was always small, and finally disbanded in 1998).

He received the David W. Taylor Medal in 1964. In 1970 Schade received the Gibbs Brothers Medal of the National Academy of Sciences, and was elected to the National Academy of Engineering in 1973.

Retirement, family, and death
Commodore Schade finally retired from University of California at Berkeley in 1968.

Schade and his wife, the former Alice Houseman of Pasadena, California, had two sons, Henry A. Schade, Jr. and Richard J. Schade. Alice Schade died in 1990. Commodore Henry Adrian "Packy" Schade died less than two years later in 1992.

Legacy
Rear Admiral Henry Adrian "Packy" Schade proved just the right man, placed in exactly the right job, at precisely the right time. His particular expertise in the strength of welded ship structures made him uniquely qualified to oversee the rapid construction of the US Navy's aircraft carrier building program during the world's first ever carrier war.

Modern day researchers of World War II era aircraft carriers, both student and professional, can visit the records of BuShips held at the National Archives and Records Administration, in College Park, Maryland. There they will find, indelibly marked for posterity, Schade's impact on the US Navy carrier program. The serial number of nearly every carrier document carries the mark of "(512)" - Schade's Carrier Desk; and nearly all of those bear his classic handwritten big, bold, openly scripted partial signature "Sch".

Schade indeed left his mark upon BuShips during World War II, but he also continues to impact lives today. Professional papers of modern-day Naval Architects frequently draw upon his concepts, passages, and papers as references for their own academic studies. Students are still today exploring Schade's original theoretical thinking on effective breadth of ship structures and often cite his works in their doctoral dissertations.

Commodore Henry Adrian "Packy" Schade may be the least known man of World War II. But, he may also be as equally responsible for victory in the Pacific as any pilot that ever took off from, or landed on, one of his carriers.

Decorations

Commodore Henry Adrian Schade's ribbon bar:

References

 Rear Admiral HA Schade, USN, Ret.; Naval History Division, Naval Historical Center, USN, Washington Navy Yard, Washington, DC; nd, (circa 1948).
 Bending Theory of Ship Bottom Structure; HA Schade; Transactions; Society of Naval Architects and Marine Engineers (SNAME); 1938.
 Design Curves for Cross-Stiffened Plating Under Uniform Bending Load; HA Schade; Transactions; Society of Naval Architects and Marine Engineers (SNAME); 1941.
 Deformation and Stresses in Pipe Bends; HA Schade, et al.; Department of Naval Construction, Massachusetts Institute of Technology; 1928.
 Theory of Motions of Craft in Waves; HA Schade; Department of Engineering, University of California at Berkeley; 1950.
 Statik des Schiff-Bodens unter Wasserdruck; HA Schade; Doctoral Dissertation; Technische Hochschule, Berlin, Germany; 1937.
 Commendation for award of Legion of Merit to Captain Henry A. Schade; Naval History Division, Operational Archives, Naval Historical Center, Washington Navy Yard, Washington, DC.
 Commendation for award of Gold Star in lieu of second Legion of Merit to Commodore Henry A. Schade; Naval History Division, Operational Archives, Naval Historical Center, Washington Navy Yard, Washington, DC.
 The Effective Breadth of Stiffened Plating Under Bending Loads; HA Schade; Transactions; Society of Naval Architects and Marine Engineers (SNAME); 1951.
 The Effective Breadth Concept in Ship Structure Design; Transactions; Society of Naval Architects and Marine Engineers; 1953.
 On the Study of Effective Breadth for Stiffened Plate Under Flexible Support Condition; Kyung Su Kim, et al.; Key Engineering Materials; Vols. 297-300, pp. 2375–2381; 2005.
 An Evaluation of Finite Element Models of Stiffened Plates Subjected to Impulsive Loading; Omri Pedatzur; Department of Ocean Engineering and Department of Mechanical Engineering; Massachusetts Institute of Technology; 2004.

External links
History of the U.S. Naval Technical Mission in Europe, 1942-1949 MS 37 held by Special Collections & Archives, Nimitz Library at the United States Naval Academy

1900 births
1992 deaths
United States Navy commodores
United States Naval Academy alumni
United States Navy World War II admirals
United States Navy admirals
American mechanical engineers
American naval architects
Recipients of the Legion of Merit
Manhattan Project people
Members of the United States National Academy of Engineering
20th-century American architects
20th-century American engineers
Engineers from Minnesota